Carlo Fassi (20 December 1929 – 20 March 1997) was an Italian figure skater and international coach whose students included several World and Olympic champions. As a single skater, he was the 1953 World bronze medalist, a two-time European champion (1953, 1954), and a ten-time Italian national champion (1945–54).

Personal life 
Fassi was born in Milan, the son of a builder. He spoke five languages. He married Christa Fassi (von Kuczkowski) in 1960. They had three children: Ricardo, Monika, and Lorenzo.

Competitive career 
Fassi competed in two disciplines at the 1948 Winter Olympics in St. Moritz, Switzerland, placing 15th in men's singles and 13th in pair skating with partner Grazia Barcellona. Appearing only in men's singles, he finished sixth at the 1952 Winter Olympics in Oslo, Norway.
 
Fassi won gold at the European Championships in 1953 and 1954, and the bronze medal at the World Championships in 1953. He was the Italian national men's champion for ten years.

Coaching career 
Declining to join the Ice Capades, Fassi took up coaching after the end of his competitive career. From 1956 to 1961, he coached at the Olympic Stadium in Cortina d'Ampezzo, Italy, and for four years served as the trainer for the Italian World team. One of his first students was German skater Christa von Kuczkowski.

Following the 1961 plane crash that killed the entire U.S. figure skating team and many of the top American coaches, Fassi moved with his family to the United States, where he soon became established as a top international coach. He was based first at the famous Broadmoor Arena in Colorado Springs, Colorado, then for a time in Denver, Colorado before returning to the Broadmoor in the early 1980s. He spent three years in Italy in the early 1990s and then returned to the U.S. to coach at the Ice Castle rink in Lake Arrowhead, California.

His students included World and Olympic champions Peggy Fleming, Dorothy Hamill, John Curry, Robin Cousins, and Jill Trenary. He also coached Scott Hamilton and Paul Wylie in the early stages of their careers. Skaters from all over the world came to train with Fassi, giving his training camp a strongly cosmopolitan and international atmosphere.

In addition to being an excellent technical coach, Fassi had the reputation of being a master of political dealings in the figure skating world, with the ability to bring his students to the attention of the judges. He was such an icon in the sport that when the comic character Snoopy adopted an alter ego as a figure skating coach (appearing, for example, in the 1980 TV special She's a Good Skate, Charlie Brown), it was clearly modelled upon Fassi.

Fassi died of a heart attack at the 1997 World Championships in Lausanne, which he was attending as the coach of Nicole Bobek and Cornel Gheorghe. He was inducted into the Coaches Hall of Fame by the Professional Skaters Association in 2002.

1980 Olympics controversy
After Fassi's death, U.S. skater Linda Fratianne and her coach Frank Carroll alleged that Fassi had conspired to "rob" Fratianne of the gold medal at the 1980 Winter Olympics by masterminding a deal with Eastern-bloc judges to swap votes for his own pupil Robin Cousins in the men's event with those for the East German champion Anett Pötzsch in the ladies' event. The allegations became so well known that the story has subsequently been repeated as if it were fact.

Sonia Bianchetti, referee of the men's competition at those Olympics, has denied that the judging of either event was incorrect, and noted that only two of the nine judges on the ladies' panel were from Eastern-bloc countries—while five other judges also gave their first-place votes to Pötzsch. Benjamin Wright, the American referee of the ladies' event, instead blamed the method of tabulating scores that was in effect at that time for Fratianne's defeat.

Fassi had five students of his own competing in the ladies' event in Lake Placid: Emi Watanabe of Japan, Susanna Driano of Italy, Claudia Kristofics-Binder of Austria, Kristiina Wegelius of Finland, and Karena Richardson of Great Britain.

Results

Men's singles

Pairs with Barcellona

References

Navigation

1929 births
1997 deaths
Figure skaters from Milan
Italian male single skaters
Italian figure skating coaches
Olympic figure skaters of Italy
Figure skaters at the 1952 Winter Olympics
Figure skaters at the 1948 Winter Olympics
World Figure Skating Championships medalists
European Figure Skating Championships medalists